T. Glenn Pait is the Director of the T. Glenn Pait Spine Clinic located in the UAMS Jackson T. Stephens Spine Institute.

Education and training
Pait went to medical school and completed his residency in Neurological Surgery at George Washington University School of Medicine. He completed medical school in 1981. He is a fellow in the American College of Surgeons and the American Association of Neurological Surgery.

Spine clinic
The T. Glenn Pait Spine Clinic includes a multidisciplinary team that deals with patients with spine problems. They have a surgical spine specialist, a nonsurgical spine specialist, a spine psychiatrist, a pain management specialist, a psychiatrist and psychologist.

Radio show
Pait is the co-creator and co-host of the popular weekly radio show "Here's to Your Health." It is produced in the US and broadcasts online and on various NPR affiliate stations.

Awards and honors
 Fellow (FAANS), American Association of Neurological Surgeons 2014 
 CMS Meaningful Use Stage 1 Certification, EpicCare Ambulatory EMR, Epic Systems Corporation 
 Regional Top Doctor, Castle Connolly 2014

Publications
 The influence of war on the development of neurosurgery. Dowdy, J.,Pait, T. G.; J. Neurosurg.. 2013 Oct 15.
 Placement of unilateral lag screw through the lateral mass of C-1: description of a novel technique. Tabbosha, M.,Dowdy, J.,Pait, T. G.; J Neurosurg Spine. 2013 Jul.
7 citations
 "General surgical pearls" for the anterior exposure of vertebral fractures. Barone, G. W., Pait, T. G., Eidt, J. F., Howington, J. A.; Am Surg. 2001 Oct.
 The Rumel technique for lateral thoracotomy closure. Barone, G. W., Pait, T. G., Lightfoot, M. L., Ketel, B. L.; J Cardiovasc Surg (Torino). 2001 Aug.
 Compound osteosynthesis in the thoracic spine for treatment of vertebral metastases. Technical report. Pait, T. G., de Castro, I., Arnautovic, K. I., Borba, L. A.; Arq Neuropsiquiatr. 2000 Mar.
 Inside-outside technique for posterior occipitocervical spine instrumentation and stabilization: preliminary results. Pait, T. G., Al-Mefty, O., Boop, F. A., Arnautovic, K. I., Rahman, S., Ceola, W.; J Neurosurg. 1999 Jan.
 Herophilus of Alexandria (325-255 B. C.). The father of anatomy. Wiltse, L. L., Pait, T. G.; Spine. 1998 Sep 1.
 Muscle and musculocutaneous flap coverage of exposed spinal fusion devices. Hochberg, J., Ardenghy, M., Yuen, J., Gonzalez-Cruz, R., Miura, Y., Conrado, R. M., Pait, T. G.; Plast Reconstr Surg. 1998 Aug.
 The anterior extrapleural approach to the thoracolumbar junction revisited. Barone, G. W., Eidt, J. F., Webb, J. W., Hudec, W. A., Pait, T. G.; Am Surg. 1998 Apr.
 Pitfalls and successes of peer review in neurosurgery. Laws, E. R., Pait, T. G., Jane, J. A.; J Neurosurg. 1997 Dec.

References

Year of birth missing (living people)
Living people
American neurosurgeons
George Washington University School of Medicine & Health Sciences alumni